The aliʻi were the traditional nobility of the Hawaiian islands. They were part of a hereditary line of rulers, the noho aliʻi.

The word aliʻi has a similar meaning in the Samoan language and other Polynesian languages, and in Māori it is pronounced "ariki".

Background
In ancient Hawaiian society, the aliʻi were hereditary nobles (a social class or caste). The aliʻi consisted of the higher and lesser chiefs of the various levels on the islands. The noho aliʻi were the ruling chiefs. The aliʻi were believed to be descended from the deities.

There were eleven classes of aliʻi, of both men and women. These included the kahuna (priestesses and priests, experts, craftsmen, and canoe makers) as part of four professions practiced by the nobility. Each island had its own aliʻi nui, who governed their individual systems. Aliʻi continued to play a role in the governance of the Hawaiian islands until 1893, when Queen Liliʻuokalani was overthrown by a coup d'état backed by the United States government.

Aliʻi nui were ruling chiefs (in Hawaiian, nui means grand, great, or supreme.). The nui title could be passed on by right of birth.

Social designations of noho aliʻi (ruling line)
Samuel M. Kamakau writes extensively about the aliʻi nui and kaukaualiʻi lines and their importance to Hawaiian history.

Aliʻi nui were supreme high chiefs of an island and no others were above them (during the Kingdom period this title would come to mean "Governor"). The four largest Hawaiian islands (Hawaiʻi proper, Maui, Kauaʻi, and Oʻahu) were usually ruled each by their own aliʻi nui. Molokaʻi also had a line of island rulers, but was later subjected to the superior power of nearby Maui and Oʻahu during the seventeenth and eighteenth centuries. Mōʻī was a special title for the highest chief of the island of Maui. Later, the title was used for all rulers of the Hawaiian Islands and the Hawaiian monarchs.
Aliʻi nui kapu were sacred rulers with special taboos.
Aliʻi Piʻo were a rank of chiefs who were products of full blood sibling unions. Famous Piʻo chiefs were the royal twins, Kameʻeiamoku and Kamanawa. 
Aliʻi Naha were a rank of chiefs who were products of half-blood sibling unions; famous Naha chiefs include Keōpūolani. 
Aliʻi Wohi were a rank of chiefs who were products of marriage of close relatives other than siblings; one famous Wohi chief was Kamehameha I. These chiefs possessed the kapu wohi, exempting them from kapu moe (prostration taboo).
Kaukaualiʻi were lesser chiefs who served the aliʻi nui. It is a relative term and not a fixed level of aliʻi nobility. The expression is elastic in terms of how it is used. In general, it means a relative who is born from a lesser ranking parent. A kaukaualiʻi son's own children, if born of a lesser ranking aliʻi mother, would descend to a lower rank. Eventually the line descends, leading to makaʻāinana (commoner). Kaukaualiʻi gain rank through marriage with higher-ranking aliʻi.

One kaukaualiʻi line descended from Moana Kāne, son of Keākealanikāne, became secondary aliʻi to the Kamehameha rulers of the kingdom and were responsible for various hana lawelawe (service tasks). Members of this line married into the Kamehamehas, including Charles Kanaʻina and Kekūanāoʻa. Some bore Kāhili, royal standards made of feathers, and were attendants of the higher-ranking aliʻi. During the monarchy some of these chiefs were elevated to positions within the primary political bodies of the Hawaiian legislature and the king's Privy Council. All Hawaiian monarchs after Kamehameha III were the children of Kaukaualiʻi fathers who married higher ranking wives.

See also 
 Ruling chiefs of Hawaiʻi
 Ancient Hawaiʻi
 Kingdom of Hawaiʻi
 Aliʻi nui of Hawaiʻi
 Aliʻi nui of Maui
 Aliʻi nui of Oʻahu
 Aliʻi nui of Kauaʻi
 List of monarchs of Tonga
 List of monarchs of Tahiti
 List of monarchs of Huahine
 List of monarchs of Mangareva

References

Further reading
 
 

 
 
 

Hawaiiana
Hawaii culture
Hawaiian nobility
Noble titles
Samoan words and phrases
Society of Samoa
Polynesian culture
Polynesian titles
Nobility of the Americas